PT GoTo Gojek Tokopedia Tbk, trading as GoTo, is an Indonesian holding company. The company was formed in 2021 in a merger — the largest in the country at that time between Indonesia's two most valuable startups, ride-hailing giant Gojek and e-commerce firm Tokopedia.

GoTo is the most valuable startup in Indonesia, contributes to about 2% of the country's GDP.

Alibaba and SoftBank each own about 9 per cent of GoTo.

History 

Gojek was founded in Indonesia in 2010 as a call center to arrange transportation and courier deliveries, while Tokopedia was founded in Indonesia in 2009 as an e-commerce platform. In 2015, the two companies began a partnership, through which Gojek drivers delivered Tokopedia products. GoTo was founded in May 2021 and it was reported shortly afterwards that the combined entity had 100 million monthly active users, more than 11 million merchants, and over 2 million drivers and offered e-commerce, ride-hailing, food delivery and financial services among other offerings. In May 2021, GoTo's financial services arm, GoTo Financial, was also created at the same time as the merger.

In December 2021, it was reported that GoTo had "hired banks to help it raise around US$1 billion" from an initial public offering (IPO) in Indonesia.

In March 2022, GoTo announced that it would list on the Indonesia Stock Exchange the following month, expecting to issue 52 million shares, and raise at least US$1.1 billion from the IPO.

On 11 April 2022, GoTo listed on the Indonesia Stock Exchange with a $1.1 billion IPO at a price of 338 IDR per share, climbing more than 15% to 388 IDR in the first day of trading.

Products
GoTo comprises three business arms: Gojek, Tokopedia, and GoTo Financial.

Gojek 
Gojek is an on-demand multi-service platform that books drivers for transportation or for other services such as grocery deliveries. Kevin Aluwi is the company's CEO and he has said it was "founded on the realization that we could better utilize the informal sector to reduce life’s daily frictions for people in Indonesia".

Tokopedia 
Tokopedia is one of Indonesia's most popular online shopping portals and, it has been reported, its ‘most valuable tech business after Gojek itself’. William Tanuwijaya is the company's CEO.

GoTo Financial 
GoTo Financial covers services such as GoPay, GoSure, GoInvestasi, GoPayLater, Midtrans and Moka. Andre Soelistyo is the GoTo Financial's CEO, as well as the CEO of GoTo.

References 

 
2021 establishments in Indonesia
2022 initial public offerings
Companies based in Jakarta
Companies listed on the Indonesia Stock Exchange
Financial services companies of Indonesia
Indonesian brands
Technology companies of Indonesia
Ridesharing companies